The 2020 Salt Lake County mayoral election was held to elect the next mayor of Salt Lake County, Utah on November 3, 2020, alongside the presidential, House of Representatives and gubernatorial elections. This marked the sixth election to the office since the post was created in 2000.

On January 2, 2019, incumbent two-term County Mayor, Democrat Ben McAdams, resigned after being elected to represent Utah's 4th congressional district, triggering a 30-day deadline for the Salt Lake County Democratic Party Central Committee to vote for the replacement mayor. On January 26, 2019, the Committee elected county councilwoman at-large Jenny Wilson, unsuccessful 2018 Senate candidate, to succeed McAdams. No primary elections were held. Wilson was re-elected to a full term, beating Republican candidate, Riverton city Mayor Trent Staggs in the general election.

Candidates

Democratic Party
 Jenny Wilson, incumbent County Mayor

Republican Party
 Trent Staggs, Mayor of Riverton, Utah

Green Party
 Michael W. Cundick, environmental activist

Results

References

External links
 Trent Staggs for County Mayor (R)
 Michael Cundick for Salt Lake County Mayor (G)

Salt Lake County
Salt Lake County
2020 in Utah
2020s in Salt Lake City